Pryde is an obsolete spelling of the English word pride now most frequently encountered as a surname.

Notable people with the name include:
 Bob Pryde (1913–98), Scottish soccer player
 David Pryde (1913–87), Scottish soccer player
 David Johnstone Pryde (1890—1959), Scottish Labour politician
 Duncan Pryde (1937–97), Canadian hunter, trapper, lexicographer and politician
 James Pryde (1866–1941), Scottish artist working mainly in graphics
 Josephine Pryde (born 1967), English artist
 Mabel Pryde (1871–1918), Scots-born English artist
 Peggy Pryde (1867–1943), British music hall performer
 Susy Pryde (born 1973), New Zealand cyclist

Business
 Neil Pryde Ltd (Pryde Group), Company designing water sport equipment

Fictional
 Kitty Pryde, otherwise Katherine Pryde, Marvel Comics Superhero
 Allegiant General Pryde, Star Wars First Order character

See also
 Pride (surname)
 Pryde Henry Teves, Filipino politician